Only for You is Taiwanese Mandopop artist Show Lo's eighth Mandarin studio album. It was released on 18 February 2011 by Gold Typhoon (Taiwan). The album was available for preorder from 28 January 2011 in two limited editions, of 30,000 copies each with serial numbers and photobook: Only For You (Gentry Love Edition) (獨一無二 紳情款款版) and Only For You (Flower World Edition) (獨一無二 花花仕界版). For the first time the first lead track is a ballad "拼什麼" (What Am I Fighting For?).

A further two editions were released by Gold Typhoon: Only for You (10001st Night Celebration Edition) (2CD) on 18 March 2011 with two new tracks and Only for You (MV Collectable Edition) (CD+DVD) on 6 May 2011 with nine music videos and photobook. The Japanese edition, Only for You (Japanese Edition) was released on 20 July 2011 by Pony Canyon, which included a special bonus track of the Japanese version of title track "獨一無二" (Only You) and a DVD with 10 music videos.

Album
The album was marketed with the "拼什麼" (What Am I Fighting For) track, which was rather unconventional, as he often markets an album through a dance piece. The music video for the second lead track "獨一無二" (Only You) was released nine days later. The video consists of dance piece choreographed by Shaun Evaristo. It was reported to have costed NT$5 million to create European scenery and to debut the "Anti-Gravity filming technique".

Reception
The album debuted at number one on Taiwan's G-Music Top 20 Weekly Mandarin and Combo Charts, and Five Music Chart at week 8 (18 to 24 February 2011) with a percentage sales of 74.6%, 48.43% and 78.8% respectively. Suppressing fellow artist Jolin Tsai's record at G-Music Mandarin Chart of 68.11% for Butterfly in 2009 and became the highest debut week percentage sales in the chart's seven-year history. As of 3 March 2011 the album has sold 103,628 copies.

The tracks, "獨一無二" (Only You) and "拼什麼" (What Am I Fighting For) are listed on the Top 20 Gold Songs of the (January to June) 2011 Global Chinese Golden Chart. The album is the best selling album in Taiwan in 2011, with 150,000 copies sold.

Track listing

Music videos

N.B - The date refers to the premiere date

Releases
 28 January 2011 - limited pre-order editions: Only For You (Gentry Love Edition) (獨一無二 紳情款款版) and Only For You (Flower World Edition) (獨一無二 花花仕界版), both with photobook and gifts.
 18 February 2011 - Only for You (CD)
 18 March 2011 -  Only for You (10001st Night Celebration Edition) (2CD) (獨一無二 冠軍慶功版 一萬零一夜) with a bonus CD containing two new tracks:
 "一萬零一夜" (10001st Night)
 "陪你到最後" (With you Till the End)

 6 May 2011 -  Only for You (MV Collectable Edition) (CD+DVD) (獨一無二 音珍藏盤) with nine music videos and a MV photobook
 "拼什麼" (Hero in Vain) MV
 "獨一無二" (Only You) MV
 "Touch My Heart" MV
 "Touch My Heart" (Drama Version) MV
 "美麗的誤會" (Beautiful Mistake) MV
 "一萬零一夜" (10001st Night) MV
 "怕安靜" (Silence Phobia) MV
 "口頭纏" (Magic Words) MV
 "陪你到最後" (With you Till the End) MV

 20 July 2011 - Only for You (Japanese Edition) (CD+DVD) by Pony Canyon, Japan

CD
 "ONLY YOU/獨一無二"
 "Beautiful Mistake/美麗的誤會"
 "Hero in Vain/拼什麼"
 "TOUCH MY HEART"
 "Nowhere to Hide/舞所遁形"
 "Silence Phobia/怕安静"
 "Brave Death/強出頭"
 "Pains Swallowed/忍住"
 "Magic Words/口頭纏"
 "Let Love Show/愛享痩"
 "The 10001st Night/一萬零一夜"
 "Be With You Till the End/陪你到最後"
 "ONLY YOU/獨一無二" (Japanese Version) - special bonus track

DVD
 "拼什麼" (Hero in Vain) MV
 "獨一無二" (Only You) MV
 "Touch My Heart" MV
 "Touch My Heart" (Drama Version) MV
 "美麗的誤會" (Beautiful Mistake) MV
 "一萬零一夜" (10001st Night) MV
 "怕安靜" (Silence Phobia) MV
 "口頭纏" (Magic Words) MV
 "陪你到最後" (With you Till the End) MV
 TV spot

Charts

Taiwanese Chart

Japanese Chart
(Only For You Japanese Edition)

References

External links
  Show Lo@Gold Typhoon Taiwan
  Show Lo - Bio, News, Images, Album releases (Gold Typhoon)

2011 albums
Show Lo albums
Gold Typhoon Taiwan albums